John Brass  (born 1946) is an Australian rugby union and rugby league footballer.

John Brass may also refer to:

John Brass (colliery manager) (1879–1961), British mine manager and later director of Houghton Main Colliery Co Ltd.
John Brass (writer) (1790–1833), English clergyman, classicist and educational writer

See also
Leonard John Brass (1900–1971), Australian and American botanist, botanical collector and explorer